The Millbury Street Head Start is a historic school building at 389 Millbury Street in Worcester, Massachusetts.  The building, a Romanesque brick structure built in 1898-99, was originally called Millbury Street Schoolhouse #4 and was later known as the Ward Street School.  Designed by J.W. Patston, it was listed on the National Register of Historic Places in 1980.  It now houses Head Start programs run under the auspices of the Worcester Public Schools.

Description and history
It is a 2-1/2 story brick building, built out of red brick and covered by a hipped roof. The roof has wide side dormers, and a central projecting gable-ended section projects to the north (toward Harlem Street). At either end of the projecting section, rounded archways shelter recessed entrances. The building foundation is rock-faced granite, and it has sandstone trim elements.

The building was designed by J. W. Patston and was built in 1898-99.  It is the last of four similar schools to be built at the time in the city, and is the least altered of those that survive.  At the time of its construction, the parcel on which it was built had three other schools on it, all of which were subsequently demolished by encroaching residential and highway development (the building is just east of Interstate 290.

See also
National Register of Historic Places listings in eastern Worcester, Massachusetts

References

School buildings on the National Register of Historic Places in Massachusetts
School buildings completed in 1898
Schools in Worcester, Massachusetts
National Register of Historic Places in Worcester, Massachusetts
1898 establishments in Massachusetts
Romanesque Revival architecture in Massachusetts